A Good Girl's Guide to Murder is a young adult mystery debut novel by Holly Jackson. The novel is the first in a series of three novels and one novella: A Good Girl's Guide to Murder (2019); Good Girl, Bad Blood (2020); As Good As Dead (2021); and Kill Joy (2022). Except for Good Girl, Bad Blood, all books were published by Electric Monkey. Good Girl, Bad Blood was published by Delacorte Press.

The plot follows an investigation carried out by 17-year old true crime enthusiast Pippa “Pip” Fitz-Amobi, a high school student in the fictional town of Little Kilton, Buckinghamshire (or Fairview, Connecticut in the US version). In the novel, Pip crafts a plan to investigate a five-year-old murder-suicide case involving the murder of popular student Andrea "Andie" Bell and the suicide of her perpetrator Salil "Sal" Singh under the guise of a school project. Her objectives are to exonerate Sal, whom she is convinced was falsely accused of killing Andie Bell, and to uncover the true perpetrator, whom Pip believes is still at large.

Plot
Five years ago, a tragic murder-suicide rocked the small town of Little Kilton (or Fairview in the US edition) when school girl Andrea "Andie" Bell was brutally murdered and her boyfriend, Salil "Sal" Singh, was ultimately accused before seemingly taking his own life. But 17-year-old Pippa "Pip" Fitz-Amobi, a brilliant and determined student, is convinced that the real killer is still out there, lurking in the shadows. Using her wit and cunning, she launches a secret investigation, posing as a student working on a school project about media involvement in the case, and teams up with Sal's younger brother Ravi to uncover the truth and clear Sal's name.

As they dig deeper, Pip and Ravi embark on a thrilling journey of discovery, interviewing key players and unearthing shocking new evidence. But they soon realize that they're not the only ones hunting for the truth, and they must race against time to stay ahead of the killer, who will stop at nothing to keep their secrets buried.

Through sheer determination and unwavering courage, Pip and Ravi manage to crack the case and bring the real killer to justice, not only solving Andie's murder but also uncovering a web of lies and corruption that had been hiding in plain sight. Their findings not only clear Sal's name but also puts the actual killer behind bars. As their project goes public and the media's attention is drawn, the town is shocked by the revelation of the true story behind the tragic event, and the characters are hailed as heroes for their bravery and persistence in the face of danger.

Reception 
A Good Girl's Guide to Murder was named one of the best books of 2020 by Barnes and Noble and received the following accolades:

 American Library Association's Amazing Audiobooks for Young Adults (2021)
 Goodreads Choice Award Nominee for Young Adult Fiction (2020)
 YA Book Prize shortlist (2020)
 British Book Awards Children's Fiction Book Winner of the Year (2020)

Sequels and prequel

Good Girl, Bad Blood (2020)
The novel picks up where the first book left off, with Pippa "Pip" Fitz-Amobi hailed as an amateur detective online after creating a podcast called A Good Girl's Guide To Murder, based on the events that took place in the previous novel. However, Pip has promised herself that she will never take on another case again after nearly getting killed and losing her beloved dog Barney. But when her friend Connor's brother Jamie goes missing, Pip begins to suspect Jamie's disappearance is related to her previous case and becomes certain that Jamie could be in deep trouble.

Pip starts digging into Jamie's past and present, conducting interviews and piecing together clues. But as she gets closer to the truth, she realises that Jamie's case is connected to a dark and dangerous criminal ring involved in illegal activities like drug trafficking and human trafficking. Not only that, but it seems like somebody is always one step ahead of her and trying to stop her from uncovering the truth.

As she delves deeper into the investigation, Pip finds herself in the crosshairs of a ruthless killer who seems to know her every move and will stop at nothing to keep the truth buried. The danger is real, and Pip's life is on the line as she races against time to find Jamie and put a stop to the criminal activities.

Good Girl, Bad Blood was shortlisted for the YA Book Prize in 2021.

As Good As Dead (2021) 
Following the events of Good Girl, Bad Blood, Pip has been left psychologically traumatised and unable to sleep at night. Her life already at an all time low, things take a turn for the worse when she becomes the target of a relentless, anonymous stalker. The stalker sends her constant messages, asking her the same question "Who will look for you when you're the one that disappears?" At first, Pip tries to brush off the threats, hoping it is just an internet troll, but as the messages become more frequent and the stalker's presence looms closer and closer to her home, she begins to realise that the danger is real, imminent, and inescapable. Despite her desperate pleas, the police refuse to take her seriously, leaving Pip to face the stalker alone.

Now armed with a past experience in solving murders and uncovering the truth, Pip starts to dig deeper into the mystery, using her own resource and contacts, interviewing people and following leads, but the further she goes, the more she realises that the stalker is someone who is closely tied to her past cases and have a vendetta against her. The stalker seems to know everything about her, every move, every thought, and as Pip finds herself being constantly watched, she begins to feel like there's no escape.

As the investigation progresses, Pip discovers that the stalker is a dangerous serial killer who has been active for years, targeting bright young women like herself. The killer seems to be one step ahead at all times, leaving Pip to feel like she's always being watched and that there's no escape. The stakes are higher than ever, and she realises that this time, she's not just trying to solve a case - she's trying to save herself from becoming the killer’s next victim.

As Good As Dead received a positive review from The Guardian, who named the book "a taut, compulsively readable, elegantly plotted thriller."

Kill Joy (2021)
Kill Joy is a prequel novella set a little while before the first book in the series. It follows the events taking place at a friend’s birthday party, which is set up to be a 1920’s themed murder mystery dinner. At first, Pip is not excited about the idea of a mock murder investigation, and would much rather stay home and work on her school project for the upcoming academic year, but she decides to attend for the sake of her friends. 

But as the night wears on, Pip finds herself drawn into the investigation surrounding the fictional murder case of Reginald Remy. Using her sharp intellect and keen eye for detail to piece together the clues, she is soon caught up in this game of intrigue and deception and finds herself becoming more and more invested in the case, determined to be the one to crack it open and uncover the truth.

As the night comes to a close, Pip is left with the realisation that she is unable to resist the pull of the unknown, and that perhaps this game is not just a game, but a prelude to a bigger, more important real-life investigation into a locally infamous tragic murder-suicide that she could perhaps try her hand at solving.

Adaptation
In September 2022, it was revealed BBC Three had commissioned a television adaptation of A Good Girl's Guide to Murder from Moonage Pictures penned by Poppy Cogan.

References 

2019 British novels
British novels adapted into television shows
Young adult novel series
British mystery novels
Electric Monkey books
2019 children's books